"Please, Please Baby" is a song written and recorded by American country music artist Dwight Yoakam.  It was released in November 1987 as the third single from his album Hillbilly Deluxe.  It peaked at number 6 on the Billboard Hot Country Songs chart and number 2 on the Canadian RPM country singles chart. This song was reprised by Dwight on his live album, Dwight Live and on the acoustic album dwightyoakamacoustic.net.

Music video
The live performance music video, taken from the 1995 album Dwight Live, was directed by Bud Schaetzle, and premiered in mid-1995.

Chart performance

Year-end charts

References

1987 singles
1987 songs
Dwight Yoakam songs
Songs written by Dwight Yoakam
Reprise Records singles
Song recordings produced by Pete Anderson